François Chevalier (14 May 1893 – 10 January 1983) was a French racing cyclist. He rode in the 1919 Tour de France.

References

1893 births
1983 deaths
French male cyclists
Place of birth missing